Maria Lourdes "Luli" Heras-de Leon is a Filipino business executive and serves as a managing director of Ayala Corporation. She served as president of Ayala Foundation.

Career and education 
Before joining Ayala, Luli was vice-president for Policy, Government, and Public Affairs at Chevron Geothermal Philippines Holdings (CGPHI), a wholly owned subsidiary of Chevron Corporation.

Luli holds a Bachelor of Arts in Asian Studies from the University of British Columbia and a Master in Business Administration from Thunderbird School of Global Management.

She started her career as a credit analyst with First City National Bank of Texas, eventually becoming senior vice-president of the bank’s Real Estate Division.  She also served as president of the Economic Development Division of the Greater Houston Partnership, where she led inbound investment and recruitment initiatives for Houston, Texas.

References

Year of birth missing (living people)
Living people
21st-century Filipino businesspeople
University of British Columbia alumni
Thunderbird School of Global Management alumni
Ayala Corporation people